Imay-Karmaly (İmay-Qaramalı) is a rural locality (a selo) and the administrative centre of Imay-Karmalinsky Selsoviet, Davlekanovsky District, Bashkortostan, Russia. The population was 330 as of 2010. There are 3 streets.

Geography 
Imay-Karmaly is located 30 km east of Davlekanovo (the district's administrative centre) by road. Tashlytamak is the nearest rural locality.

References 

Rural localities in Davlekanovsky District